"Four Seasons in One Day" is a song by rock group Crowded House, released as a single in June 1992. It was co-written by Neil Finn and brother Tim Finn, originally intended for their debut Finn Brothers album; however, it was moved onto the Woodface project as the two projects amalgamated. The song's title references a common saying used in Melbourne to describe the city's changeable weather. The song reached number 26 on the UK Singles Chart and number 47 on the Australian ARIA Singles Chart. The song also peaked at number 68 in Canada, but was not released in the US.

The song was later released on the group's greatest hits collection Recurring Dream and was performed at the group's farewell performance in 1996, Farewell to the World.

After the death of Crowded House drummer Paul Hester, Tim Finn and Neil Finn had been performing together as the Finn Brothers and as a tribute to Hester, played the song in his honour at their performances.

In 2005, a tribute album was created featuring a collection of Neil and Tim Finn's songs reinterpreted by female singers as the album She Will Have Her Way. "Four Seasons in One Day" was performed by Australian multi-instrumentalist Sally Seltmann, who was known by the stage name New Buffalo. The New Buffalo version was primarily recorded in the same way as the Crowded House version, however the song title was shortened to "Four Seasons".

Inspiration
Neil Finn wrote the song in his flat in East St Kilda, a suburb of Melbourne. The song's title references a phrase used in Melbourne to refer to the city's changeable weather. Finn explained in an interview:

Music video
This was the first Crowded House video made in New Zealand. Director Kerry Brown and producer Bruce Sheridan wanted to emphasise the surreal, fantasy elements of the song, using distinctly Kiwi imagery. Locations included beaches and dense bush on the West Coast, the plains of Central Otago and the Victorian architecture of Oamaru. Scenes of an Anzac Day ceremony and marching girls also highlight the homeland setting. Brown took inspiration from Salvador Dalí paintings for the psychedelic effects that were added in post-production.

Awards
In 2001 the song was voted by members of APRA as the 84th best New Zealand song of the 20th century.

Track listings
UK 7-inch and cassette single
 "Four Seasons in One Day" – 2:48
 "There Goes God" – 3:50

UK CD single
 "Four Seasons in One Day" – 2:48
 "Dr. Livingston" – 3:57
 "Recurring Dream" – 3:24 (remix from "Tequila sunrise soundtrack)
 "Anyone Can Tell" – 3:36

Track 2; outtake from the Woodface sessions later to be released on "Afterglow", track 3: remix version from "Tequila sunrise" soundtrack, track 4; outtake from the Woodface sessions" previously released on the "Chocolate Cake" CD single and later to be released on "Afterglow".

Alternate UK CD single

"Weather with You" and "Italian Plastic" were recorded at The Town & Country Club, London, 9 November 1991. "Message to My Girl" was recorded live at the Birmingham Town Hall on 5 March 1992 and not previously recorded by Crowded House.
 "Four Seasons in One Day" – 2:48
 "Weather with You" (live) – 6:17
 "Italian Plastic" (live) – 3:28
 "Message to My Girl" (live) – 3:05

Australian CD

"There Goes God" was recorded in Maastricht, Netherlands.
 "Four Seasons in One Day" – 2:48
 "There Goes God" (live)
 "Tall Trees" – 2:19

Australian extended single

"Italian Plastic" was recorded at the State Theatre, Sydney. "Love You til the Day I Die", "It's Only Natural" and "Four Seasons in One Day" were recorded at the Newcastle Civic Theatre, Australia.
 "Four Seasons in One Day" – 2:48
 "Italian Plastic" (live) – 3:34
 "Love You till the Day I Die" (live) – 4:50
 "It's Only Natural" (live) – 4:27
 "Four Seasons in One Day" (live) – 2:59

Charts

References

Crowded House songs
1992 singles
1991 songs
APRA Award winners
Songs written by Tim Finn
Songs written by Neil Finn
Song recordings produced by Mitchell Froom
Songs about Australia
Capitol Records singles